The 2010–11 Bucknell Bison men's basketball team represented Bucknell University during the 2010–11 NCAA Division I men's basketball season. The Bison, led by third year head coach Dave Paulsen, played their home games at Sojka Pavilion as members of the Patriot League. They finished the season 25–9, 13–1 in Patriot League play to be crowned regular season champions. They won the Patriot League Basketball tournament to  receive an automatic bid to the NCAA tournament where they lost to eventual National champion Connecticut in the Round of 64.

Roster

Schedule

|-
!colspan=9 style=| Non-conference regular season

|-
!colspan=9 style=| Patriot League Regular Season

|-
!colspan=9 style=| 2011 Patriot League tournament

|-
!colspan=9 style=| 2011 NCAA tournament

References

Bucknell Bison men's basketball seasons
Bucknell
Bucknell
Bucknell Bison
Bucknell Bison